France competed at the 2018 Mediterranean Games in Tarragona, Spain from 22 June to 1 July 2018.

Medals

Karate 

Marvin Garin won the gold medal in the men's kumite 67 kg event and Jessie Da Costa won the silver medal in the men's kumite 84 kg event.

Nancy Garcia won the gold medal in the women's kumite +68 kg event and Sabrina Ouihaddadene won the bronze medal women's kumite 55 kg event.

References 

Nations at the 2018 Mediterranean Games
2018
2018 in French sport